Claus Tinney (born 1936 in Nidden) is a German actor, screenwriter and film director.

Selected filmography
 Two Among Millions (1961)
 Black Market of Love (1966)
 Hot Pavements of Cologne (1967)
 The Doctor of St. Pauli (1968)
 Death and Diamonds (1968)
 Housewives on the Job (1972)
 The Disciplined Woman (1972)
 Nurse Report (1972)

References

Bibliography 
 Peter Cowie & Derek Elley. World Filmography: 1967. Fairleigh Dickinson University Press, 1977.

External links 
 

1936 births
Living people
People from East Prussia
German film directors
People from Klaipėda County
German male film actors
20th-century German screenwriters
German male screenwriters